Mary Sciberras Fenech Adami (Maltese: Marija Sciberras Fenech Adami) (13 October 1933 – 8 July 2011) was the wife of the 7th President of Malta, Edward Fenech Adami. She was First Lady of Malta from 2004 to 2009.

Sciberras Fenech Adami was married from 27 June 1965 to 8 July 2011, when she died.

  Grand-Cross of the Order of Prince Henry, Portugal (11.12.2008)

References

External links 
Official biography

1933 births
2011 deaths
Spouses of presidents of Malta
People from Msida
Grand Crosses of the Order of Prince Henry